Noel Campbell may refer to:

 Noel Campbell (footballer) (1949–2022), Irish footballer and football manager
 Noel Campbell (hurler) (1920–1985), Irish hurler
 Noel W. Campbell (born 1941), member of the Arizona House of Representatives